The term Orthodoxy in Egypt may refer to:

 Eastern Orthodoxy in Egypt, representing adherents, communities and institutions of various Eastern Orthodox Churches, in Egypt
 Oriental Orthodoxy in Egypt, representing adherents, communities and institutions of various Oriental Orthodox Churches, in Egypt

See also
 Orthodoxy (disambiguation)
 Orthodox Church (disambiguation)
 Egypt (disambiguation)